Yeh Dooriyan ( These distances) is a 2011 Bollywood romantic drama film directed by Deepshikha, starring Deepshikha, Keshav Arora, Inder Kumar, Kunicka Lal, Ayub Khan in the lead roles.

Plot
Simi Nagpal (Deepshikha), a 35 years old independent and beautiful woman, runs a dance academy for a living. she is divorced and left with 2 children by her husband Aditya Nagpal (Inder Kumar) to look after, the only problem is the societal pressures that ask her to remarry. She is clear that only if a man named Raj Arora (Keshav Arora) accepts her children, will she marry.

Cast

 Deepshikha Nagpal as Simi A. Nagpal
 Keshav Arora as Raj Arora
 Ayub Khan as Abhay
 Inder Kumar as Aditya Nagpal, Simmi’s ex - husband 
 Achint Kaur as Pammi V. Mathur
 Rajesh Khera as Vishal Mathur, Pammi’s husband 
 Chitrashi Rawat as Nikki
 Kunika as Raj's Mother
 Delnaaz Paul as Bobby
 Salman Khan as himself
 Shishir Sharma
 Baby Vidhir as Guddu Nagpal, Aditya's son
 Bharat Bohra as Manager

Reception

Critical reception
Yeh Dooriyan was thumbed down by all top critics. Komal Nahta of Koimoi gave it half out of five stars and wrote in his review - "On the whole, Yeh Dooriyan is a poor fare which will meet with a disastrous fate at the box-office windows". Nikita Kapoor of FilmiTadka rated it with 1 out of 5 stars and said - "Yeh Dooriyan has nothing new or unique, out of the various departments that Deepshikha has tried to handle though this film, acting is the only part she has got right. We at FilmiTadka give Yeh Dooriyan 1 out of 5 stars". Nikhat Kazmi of Times of India gave it 2 out of 5 stars and wrote - "Deepshikha, on her part, does put in a restrained act as the suffering heroine, but can't say the same for the male acts. The men in the film are either hysterical (husband) or plastic (boyfriend) and the girlie gang (Delnaaz and Chitrashi) are borderline bimbettes".

Music

Track listings

Accolades

References

External links
 Official Website
 

2010s Hindi-language films
Indian comedy films
Films shot in India
Films scored by Sanjoy Chowdhury
2011 comedy films
Hindi-language comedy films